The  is a member of the Cabinet of Japan and is the leader and chief executive of the Ministry of Internal Affairs and Communications. The minister is also a statutory member of the National Security Council, and is nominated by the Prime Minister of Japan and is appointed by the Emperor of Japan.

The current minister is Takeaki Matsumoto, who took office on November 21, 2022 following the resignation of Minoru Terada.

List of Ministers for Internal Affairs and Communications (2001–)

References